Bahamian English is a group of varieties of English spoken in the Bahamas and by members of the Bahamian diaspora. The standard for official use and education is British-based with regard to spelling, vocabulary, and pronunciation; however, perceptions of the standard are more recently changing towards American norms. In particular, 21st-century news-industry and younger Bahamian speakers are often more influenced in their pronunciations by General American English or sometimes even African-American Vernacular English.

Pronunciation
The phonology of Bahamian English is believed to be derived from those of Bermudian English, Cockney English, RP, Scottish English, African-American Vernacular English, and Gullah, according to Reaser and Torbert (2004).

The Bahamian accent is traditionally non-rhotic, but often now rhotic among younger speakers.

The realization of vowels in Bahamian English is as follows. The vowels below are named by the lexical set they belong to:
The Kit vowel: The same as in American English, the default .
The Trap vowel: This vowel is mostly . It can change to  before a bilabial plosive and  before an alveolar plosive, with the former being especially common among black speakers and the latter being especially common among white speakers. The dialect does not feature the trap-bath split.
The Lot vowel: As mostly of the US, this vowel is usually .
The Strut vowel: It is the same as in the US English, .
The Palm vowel: It is mostly .
The dialect features the lot-cloth split.
The North diphthong: usually .
The Force diphthong: usually .
The Cure diphthong: usually .
The Goose vowel: It is mostly .
The Price/Prize diphthong: It's generally .
The happY vowel: It is pretty much the kit vowel: .

Vowels are often nasalized before .

This process is especially common among white speakers. This also happens in the Vincentian, Bermudian and other Caribbean Englishes.

Dental fricatives are usually changed to alveolar plosives (th-stopping):
 Voiced th becomes /d/, e.g. "That" turns into "dat"; "Those" > "Dose"; "There" > "Dere"; "They" > "Dey".
 Unvoiced th becomes /t/, e.g. "Thanks" becomes "tanks"; "Throw" > "Trow"; "Three" > "Tree".

Grammar
The grammar is not so different from the USA ( as per Zaka ).

When emphasizing a word in Bahamian English, it is common to repeat it. (the car was going fast → the car was going fast fast)

The past participle is not indicated using the verb "have" in Bahamian English. Instead, it is indicated with the verb "be", especially among white speakers. (I have already washed the clothes → I am already washed the clothes) It can also be omitted and replaced by "done", with the verb left in its present-tense form. (I done wash the clothes) This practice is common among both white and black speakers.

For some speakers (particularly black speakers), the present progressive is written using the present participle preceded by "does be" (I does be washing the clothes). Among white speakers, it is more common to just use "be" when talking in the third person. (They be washing the clothes)

The possessive indicator 's is often omitted.

Questions retain the same syntax as statements; the subject and verb do not switch their positions. (What is she doing? → What she is doing?) Thus, the use of "ain't" is highly important to distinguish an interrogative sentence from a declarative sentence.

Vocabulary
Much of Bahamian terminology is derived from British English, West African languages, and Spanish, due to the country's colonial past. Bahamian English has also come under the influence of American English due to a boost in tourism after the country gained independence, along with the resulting diffusion of American media.

Some distinctive Bahamianisms include:

Advantage (verb) - to cheat.
Aligned patch reefs (noun) - a line of reef.
Bey – supposed to mean "boy", but can also refer to any person. It can also be used as an imperative command to make somebody pay attention to a point.
Biggety (adjective) - bold or loud.
Big-up (adjective) - pregnant.
Boom-boom (noun) - buttocks.
Boonggy (noun) - the hindquarters area. As a verb, it refers to anal penetration.
Bread (noun) - a woman's genitals. Can also be expressed with "crabby".
Bubby (adjective) - big and round (of a person's lips). (Not to be confused with "bubbie", which refers to a woman's breasts.)
Broughtupcy (noun) – the way that someone is raised. "No broughtupcy" can also be used as an adjective, meaning "bad-mannered".
Buck up (verb) - to run into something or someone.
Bush crack man gone - a proverb meaning to run when trouble comes.
Capoonka (adjective) - confused.
Chirren (noun) - children.
Conchy Joe (noun) - can refer to either a white native/longtime resident of the Bahamas or a cocktail.
Coral pinnacle (noun) - can refer to a coral stack or a coral head.
Cut eye (verb) - to give somebody a dirty look.
Cut one's hip (verb) - to give somebody a beating. The noun "cut-hip" refers to a beating that is given in this act.
Doggy (noun) - a man's genitals.
Erl (noun) - oil. (Can refer to both cooking oil and motor oil.)
Ey (particle) - used at the end of a yes/no question when seeking information.
Frowsy (adjective) - foul-smelling, often in an extreme sense.
Gat - got.
Gattee - a contraction of "got to".
Grabalishus (adjective) - greedy.
Grinding (noun) - the act of having sex. Can also be expressed with "juicing".
Gumma - a contraction of "give me".
Gun casin - describes the curvature of a woman's upper thigh area.
Gyal (noun) – girl.
Hereditaments (noun) - property (of land).
Hey (particle) - used at the end of a yes/no question when seeking agreement.
I's – I am.
Islandish (adjective) - unsophisticated.
Jam up (adjective) - crowded.
Jitney (noun) - a city bus.
Jook (verb) - to poke or stab.
Jungaless (noun) - a loud, uncouth and fiesty woman.
Kerpunkle up (adjective) - drunk (on alcohol).
Leg short - an idiom used when somebody arrives too late.
Low fence (noun) - a person who is a pushover or can be taken advantage of.
Mango skin - a light-skinned person.
Mash up (verb) - to break or destroy something.
Mound reef (noun) - a boiler (of a coral reef), especially one set in deeper open water.
Muddo or muddasick (interjection) – an expression used to represent excitement, surprise, or shock.
Musse or mussy - a contraction of "must be", often used to mean only the former.
Nanny (noun) - fecal matter or excretory waste.
Peasyhead - addresses the fact that a person's hair has tight curls at the nape of their head.
Pikney (noun) - a small child.
Potcake (noun) - a stray dog.
Reef barrier (noun) - the main reef of a coral reef system.
Reef platform (noun) - the top of a coral reef, especially a flat one.
Root title (noun) - title history (of an estate).
Sea whip (noun) - an alcyonarian.
Seaward (of a reef barrier) (noun) - the back of a coral reef.
Shallow reef (noun) - a bright reef.
Show sef (verb) - to be a show-off.
Sip sip (noun) - gossip.
Sky juice (noun) - a beverage made from gin and coconut water.
Slam bam (noun) - a sausage and bread sandwich.
Sometimey (adjective) - moody.
Spilligate - used when a person goes out on the town.
Stench (verb) - to be stubborn.
Sweetheart (verb) - to cheat on one's spouse.
Switcha (noun) - lemonade.
Terreckly (adverb) - directly or soon.
Tief (verb) - to steal.
Tingsy (adjective) - materialistic.
Tingum - used to refer to a person or thing with a name that cannot be easily recalled by the speaker. Can also be represented with "t'ing".
Tote news (verb) - to spead gossip.
Trapsy (adjective) - untrustworthy.
Wammy (noun) - a derogatory term for HIV/AIDS.
Wybe (noun) - a problem or bad situation. The verb "to wybe" means to have an argument or disagreement.
Yinna (pronoun) - you (plural).

References

How to Talk like a Bahamian

Dialects of English
English
Caribbean English